Palestine participated at the 2018 Summer Youth Olympics in Buenos Aires, Argentina from 6 October to 18 October 2018.

Athletics

Swimming

Taekwondo

References

You
Nations at the 2018 Summer Youth Olympics
Palestine at the Youth Olympics